The 2003 College Nationals was the 8th Women's College Nationals. The College Nationals was a team handball tournament to determined the College National Champion from 2003 from the US.

Venues 
The championship was played at two venues at the Furman University in Greenville, South Carolina.

Modus 

The five teams played first a round robin.

The first plays against the 4th and 2nd against the 3rd of the Group stage the semis.

The losers of the semis play a small final.

The winners of the semis play the final.

Results 
Source:

Group stage

Championship

Semifinals

Small Final

Final

Final ranking 
Source:

Awards 
Source:

Top scorers 

Source:

All-Tournament Team 
Source:

References

External links 
 Tournament Results archived

USA Team Handball College Nationals by year
Furman Paladins